Frankly Howerd is a British comedy television series which aired on the BBC in six episodes between 1 May and 5 June 1959. It starred Frankie Howerd. It also featured Sidney Vivian and Helen Jessop. It was one of a number of series Howerd made for the BBC during the era. All episodes are now considered lost.

Other actors who appeared on the show included Sam Kydd, Totti Truman Taylor, Bruno Barnabe, Denys Graham, Bernard Hunter, Roger Avon and John Baker.

References

Bibliography
 Anthony Slide. Some Joe You Don't Know: An American Biographical Guide to 100 British Television Personalities. Greenwood Publishing Group, 1996.

External links
 

BBC television comedy
1959 British television series debuts
1959 British television series endings
1950s British comedy television series
English-language television shows